The 2016 season is Bangkok Glass's 6th season in the Thai Premier League, on the name of Bangkok Glass.

Foreign Players

Thai League

Thai FA Cup
Chang FA Cup

Thai League Cup
Toyota League Cup

Squad goals statistics

Transfers
First Thai footballer's market is opening on December 14, 2015 to January 28, 2016
Second Thai footballer's market is opening on June 3, 2016 to June 30, 2016

In

Out

Loan in

Notes

References

2016
Bangkok Glass